Lueg Pass is a mountain pass or defile above the Salzachöfen Gorge in Salzburg State, Austria. The terms Lueg Pass and Salzachöfen are sometimes used interchangeably to refer to the whole canyon. Lueg Pass, providing a natural access through the narrow gap, was historically one of the primary routes across the Northern Limestone Alps.

Geography

The Northern Limestone Alps are a northern parallel subrange of the Central Eastern Alps. The Berchtesgaden Alps, a constituent range of these mountains, form a barrier for north-south travel in the region. The Salzach river carves a deep valley through the mountains that culminates at Salzachöfen Gorge. The highest point of this route is traditionally known as Lueg Pass.

Lueg Pass is crossed by Highway B159 (Salzachtal Straße) as it follows the Salzach. A hotel is presently located at the height of the pass, above the tunnel. Both the A10 motorway and Salzburg-Tyrol Railway, though largely following the Salzach valley, bypass the narrow Lueg Pass through parallel tunnels under the Hagen Mountains on the opposite side of the Salzach.

History

Lueg Pass and the surrounding Salzach valley have been used as a transportation route since prehistoric times.  The pass was crossed by a Roman road in ancient times.

During the Middle Ages, tollbooths were set up at the height of the pass to collect tolls from travelers and merchants passing through the bottleneck.  The first record of a tollbooth dates to 1160 with recurring mentions up to Napoleonic times.  Most of the associated tollbooth structures were removed by the 1930s.

By the 1970s, traffic through Lueg Pass had reached congestion levels during vacation months as it was located on the Gastarbeiterroute used by guest workers from the Balkans.  The A10 motorway relieved congestion over Lueg Pass when it was completed in 1974, thereby bypassing the pass completely and reducing its importance as a transportation route.

References

Mountain passes of Salzburg (state)